James Tyrrell (c. 1450–1502) was the alleged murderer of the Princes in the Tower.

James Tyrrell may also refer to:
James Tyrrell (writer) (1642–1718), English author and political philosopher
James Tyrrell (British Army officer) (c. 1674–1742), MP for Boroughbridge
James Robert Tyrrell (1875–1961), Australian bookseller, art dealer, publisher and author
James William Tyrrell, Canadian topologist and author